La Tirana is an oil on canvas portrait by Francisco de Goya. Previously dated to 1799 due to a later pencil inscription, it is now dated to 1790-1792 by the Goya scholars José Gudiol and José Manuel Pita Andrade. It is now in the Real Academia de Bellas Artes de San Fernando in Madrid.

It is the first of two portraits he produced of the actress María del Rosario Fernández, known as 'La Tirana' after her actor husband Francisco Castellanos, who was nicknamed el Tirano. The other is in a private collection.

See also
List of works by Francisco Goya

References

Bibliography (in Spanish) 
 Glendinning, Nigel (1992). Central Hispano, ed. Goya. La década de los Caprichos. pp. 148-149. .
 Gómez García, Manuel (1998). Diccionario Akal de Teatro. Ediciones Akal. .
 Huerta, Javier; Peral, Emilio; Urzaiz, Héctor (2005). Espasa-Calpe, ed. Teatro español de la A a la Z.'' Madrid. .

External links

1792 paintings
Portraits by Francisco Goya
Paintings in the collection of the Real Academia de Bellas Artes de San Fernando